In Chinese dialectology, Beijing Mandarin refers to a major branch of Mandarin Chinese recognized by the Language Atlas of China, encompassing a number of dialects spoken in areas of Beijing, Hebei, Inner Mongolia, Liaoning, and Tianjin, the most important of which is the Beijing dialect, which provides the phonological basis for Standard Chinese. Both Beijing Mandarin and its Beijing dialect are also called Beijingese.

Classification

Beijing Mandarin and Northeastern Mandarin were proposed by Chinese linguist Li Rong as two separate branches of Mandarin in the 1980s. In Li's 1985 paper, he suggested using tonal reflexes of Middle Chinese checked tone characters as the criterion for classifying Mandarin dialects. In this paper, he used the term "Beijing Mandarin" to refer the dialect group in which checked tone characters with a voiceless initial have dark level, light level, rising and departing tone reflexes. He chose the name Beijing Mandarin as this Mandarin group is approximate to the Beijing dialect.

He subsequently proposed a split of Beijing Mandarin and Northeastern Mandarin in 1987, listing the following as reasons:

 Checked-tone characters with voiceless initials in Middle Chinese are far more commonly distributed into the rising tone category in Northeastern Mandarin than in Beijing Mandarin;
 The tonal value of the dark level tone is lower in Northeastern Mandarin than that in Beijing Mandarin;
 Generally, the 日 initial of Middle Chinese developed into a modern non-null initial in Beijing Mandarin and a modern null initial in Northeastern Mandarin.

The 2012 edition of Language Atlas of China added one more method for distinguishing Beijing Mandarin from Northeastern Mandarin:

 The modern pronunciations of the 精, 知, 莊 and 章 initials of Middle Chinese are two sets of sibilants—dental and retroflex—and these two sets are not merged or confused in Beijing Mandarin.

Meanwhile, there are some scholars who regard Beijing Mandarin and Northeastern Mandarin as a single division of Mandarin. Lin (1987) noticed the phonological similarity between Beijing Mandarin and Northeastern Mandarin. Zhang (2010) suggested that the criteria for the division of Beijing Mandarin and Northeastern Mandarin as top-level Mandarin groups are inconsistent with the criterion for the division of other top-level Mandarin groups.

Subdivisions
Beijing Mandarin is classified into the following subdivisions in the 2012 edition of Language Atlas of China:
 Jīng–Chéng
 Jīngshī, including the urban area and some inner suburbs of Beijing.
 Huái–Chéng, including some suburbs of Beijing, parts of Langfang, most parts of Chengde, Wuqing and Duolun.
 Cháo–Fēng, an area between the Huái–Chéng cluster and the Northeastern Mandarin, covering the cities of Chaoyang and Chifeng. This subgroup has characteristics intermediate of those of Beijing Mandarin and Northeastern Mandarin.

Per the 2012 edition of Atlas, these subgroups are distinguished by the following features:
 Jīng–Chéng subgroup has a high dark level tone, and the Cháo–Fēng subgroup a relatively low one;

Compared with the first edition (1987), the second edition (2012) of the Atlas demoted Jīngshī and Huái–Chéng subgroups to clusters of a new Jīng–Chéng subgroup. Shí–Kè or Běijiāng subgroup (including the cities of Shihezi and Karamay), listed as a subgroup of Beijing Mandarin in the 1987 edition, is re-allocated to a Běijiāng subgroup of Lanyin Mandarin and a Nánjiāng subgroup of Central Plains Mandarin. The Cháo–Fēng subgroup covers a greater area in the 2012 edition.

Phonological features

Initials
With regard to initials, the reflexes of kaikou hu syllables with any of the 影, 疑, 云 and 以 initials in Middle Chinese differ amongst the subgroups: a null initial is found in the Jīngshī cluster, while  or  initials are often present in the Huái–Chéng cluster and the Cháo–Fēng subgroup.

Dental and retroflex sibilants are distinct phonemes in Beijing Mandarin. This is contrary to Northeastern Mandarin, in which the two categories are either in free variation or merged into a single type of sibilants.

Tones
In both Beijing Mandarin and Northeastern Mandarin, the checked tone of Middle Chinese has completely dissolved and is distributed irregularly among the remaining tones. However, Beijing Mandarin has significantly fewer rising-tone characters with a checked-tone origin, compared with Northeastern Mandarin.

The Cháo–Fēng subgroup generally has a lower tonal value for the dark level tone.

Lexical features
The Cháo–Fēng subgroup has more words in common with that of Northeastern Mandarin.

The intensifier  is also used in the Cháo–Fēng subgroup.

Notes

References
 

 

 

 

 

 

Mandarin Chinese